Seaton Down is the location of an Iron Age hill fort in Devon, England, that takes the form of an earthwork with a large linear rampart cutting a promontory of land at the northeast end of the down off as a defensive fortification. It is slightly unusual in this layout when compared with other forts in the area.

References

Hill forts in Devon
Seaton, Devon